Scott Allen may refer to:

Scott Allen (figure skater) (born 1949), American figure skater
Scott Allen (footballer) (born 1975), Australian rules footballer
Scott Allen (ice hockey) (born 1966), ice hockey center and assistant coach
Scott Allen (politician), American politician and businessman in Wisconsin
Scott-David Allen (born 1973), singer-songwriter

See also
Scott Allan (born 1991), Scottish footballer
Scott Allan (sailor) (born 1946), American Olympic sailor